Jane Goodall is an English primatologist and anthropologist who is considered to be the world's foremost expert on chimpanzees.

Awards
 1980: Order of the Golden Ark, World Wildlife Award for Conservation
 1984: J. Paul Getty Wildlife Conservation Prize
 1985: Living Legacy Award from the International Women's League
 1985: Society of the United States; Award for Humane Excellence, American Society for the Prevention of Cruelty to Animals
 1987: Ian Biggs' Prize
 1987: Golden Plate Award, American Academy of Achievement
 1989: Encyclopædia Britannica Award for Excellence on the Dissemination of Learning for the Benefit of Mankind; Anthropologist of the Year Award
 1990: The AMES Award, American Anthropological Association; Whooping Crane Conservation Award, Conoco, Inc.; Gold Medal of the Society of Woman Geographers; Inamori Foundation Award; Washoe Award; The Kyoto Prize in Basic Science
 1991: The Edinburgh Medal
 1993: Rainforest Alliance Champion Award
 1994: Chester Zoo Diamond Jubilee Medal
 1995: Commander of the Order of the British Empire, presented by Her Majesty Queen Elizabeth II; The National Geographic Society Hubbard Medal for Distinction in Exploration, Discovery, and Research; Lifetime Achievement Award, In Defense of Animals; The Moody Gardens Environmental Award; Honorary Wardenship of Uganda National Parks
 1996: The Zoological Society of London Silver Medal; The Tanzanian Kilimanjaro Medal; The Primate Society of Great Britain Conservation Award; The Caring Institute Award; The Polar Bear Award; William Procter Prize for Scientific Achievement
 1997: John & Alice Tyler Prize for Environmental Achievement; David S. Ingells, Jr. Award for Excellence; Common Wealth Award for Public Service; The Field Museum's Award of Merit; Tyler Prize for Environmental Achievement; Royal Geographical Society / Discovery Channel Europe Award for A Lifetime of Discovery
 1998: Disney's Animal Kingdom Eco Hero Award; National Science Board Public Service Award; The Orion Society's John Hay Award
 1999: International Peace Award; Botanical Research Institute of Texas International Award of Excellence in Conservation, Community of Christ International Peace Award
 2001: Graham J. Norton Award for Achievement in Increasing Community Livability; Rungius Award of the National Museum of Wildlife Art, USA; Roger Tory Peterson Memorial Medal, Harvard Museum of Natural History; Master Peace Award; Gandhi/King Award for Non-Violence
 2002: The Huxley Memorial Medal, Royal Anthropological Institute of Great Britain and Ireland; United Nations "Messenger of Peace" Appointment
 2003: Benjamin Franklin Medal in Life Science; Harvard Medical School's Center for Health and the Global Environment Award; Prince of Asturias Award for Technical and Scientific Achievement; Dame Commander of the Order of the British Empire, presented by His Royal Highness Prince Charles; Chicago Academy of Sciences' Honorary Environmental Leader Award
 2004: Nierenberg Prize for Science in the Public Interest; Will Rogers Spirit Award, the Rotary Club of Will Rogers and Will Rogers Memorial Museums; Life Time Achievement Award, the International Fund for Animal Welfare; Honorary Degree from Haverford College
 2005: Honorary doctorate degree in science from Syracuse University
 2005: Honorary doctorate degree in science from Rutgers University
 2005: Discovery and Imagination Award
 2006: 60th Anniversary Medal of the UNESCO
 2006: French Légion d'honneur
 2007: Honorary doctorate degree in commemoration of Carl Linnaeus from Uppsala University
 2007: Honorary doctorate degree from University of Liverpool
 2008: Honorary doctorate degree from University of Toronto
 2009: Honorary doctorate degree from National University of Córdoba
2009: Honorary doctorate degree from Pablo de Olavide University
 2010: Bambi Award in the Category "Our Earth"
 2010: Golden Doves for Peace journalistic prize issued by the Italian Research Institute Archivio Disarmo
 2011: Honorary doctorate degree from American University of Paris
 2011: Grand Officer of the Order of Merit of the Italian Republic
 2012: Named Grand Marshal of the 2013 Tournament of Roses Parade
 2012: Honorary doctorate degree from National Tsing Hua University (NTHU, Taiwan)
 2013: Key to the city by Gustavo Petro, former mayor of Bogota (Colombia)
2013: Awarded an honorary doctorate by Trinity College Dublin
 2014: President's Medal by the British Academy
 2015: The Perfect World Foundation Award The Conservationist of the years 2015 & The Prize "The Fragile Rhino" 
 2017: International Cosmos Prize
 2018: Honorary doctorate degree in science from Simon Fraser University
 2019: Gold Medal of the Royal Canadian Geographical Society
2019: Honorary doctorate degree in science from McGill University
 2020: Honorary doctorate degree in science from Hasselt University
 2020: Tang Prize in Sustainable Development
 2021: Templeton Prize
 2022: Stephen Hawking Medal for Science Communication

References